Mukundapuram Lok Sabha constituency was a Lok Sabha constituency in Kerala state in southern India. It was dissolved in 2008, and was replaced by  Chalakudy Lok Sabha Constituency.

Assembly segments
Mukundapuram Lok Sabha constituency was composed of the following legislative assembly segments:

Mala
Irinjalakuda
Vadakkekara
Kodungallore
Angamali
Chalakudy
Perumbavur

Members of Parliament
As Crangannur in Thiru–Kochi
1952: K. T. Achuthan 

As Mukundapuram
1957: Narayankutty Menon, Communist Party of India
1962: Panampilly Govinda Menon, Indian National Congress
1967: Panampilly Govinda Menon, Indian National Congress
1971: A. C. George, Indian National Congress
1977: A. C. George, Indian National Congress
1980: E. Balanandan, Communist Party of India (Marxist)
1984: K. Mohandas, Kerala Congress
1989: Savithri Lakshmanan, Indian National Congress
1991: Savithri Lakshmanan, Indian National Congress
1996: P. C. Chacko, Indian National Congress
1998: A. C. Jose, Indian National Congress
1999: K. Karunakaran, Indian National Congress
2004: Lonappan Nambadan, Communist Party of India (Marxist)

See also
 Chalakudy (Lok Sabha constituency)
 List of former constituencies of the Lok Sabha

References

External links
 Election Commission of India: https://web.archive.org/web/20081218010942/http://www.eci.gov.in/StatisticalReports/ElectionStatistics.asp

Politics of Thrissur district
Former Lok Sabha constituencies of Kerala
Former constituencies of the Lok Sabha
2008 disestablishments in India
Constituencies disestablished in 2008